Rakesh Khurana (born November 22, 1967) is an 
Indian-American educator. He is a professor of sociology at Harvard University, Professor of Leadership Development at Harvard Business School and the Danoff Dean of Harvard College.

Early life and education 
Khurana was born in India and was raised in Queens, New York. He received his bachelor's degree in industrial relations from Cornell, his AM in sociology from Harvard, and his PhD in organizational behavior through a joint program between the Harvard Faculty of Arts and Sciences and Harvard Business School in 1998.

Career
Khurana is a founding team member of Cambridge Technology Partners and from 1998 to 2000 he taught at the Massachusetts Institute of Technology.   Khurana is the author of the book, Searching for a Corporate Savior: The Irrational Quest for Charismatic CEOs and related academic and managerial articles on the pitfalls of charismatic leadership.  In 2007 he published his second book From Higher Aims to Hired Hands: The Social Transformation of American Business Schools and the Unfulfilled Promise of Management as a Profession (Princeton University Press).
The book received the Max Weber prize from the American Sociological Association's Organizations, Occupations, and Work Section and was the Winner of the 2009 Gold Medal Axiom Business Book Award in Career, Jenkins Group, Inc. and the Winner of the 2007 Best Professional/Scholarly Publishing Book in Business, Finance and Management, Association of American Publishers and the Finalist for the George R. Terry Award from the Academy of Management.

He is the co-editor of the Handbook of Leadership Theory and Practice (2010), published by Harvard Business School Press and the Handbook for Teaching Leadership: Knowing, Doing and Being, (2012), published by SAGE Publications.

In March 2010, Khurana and his wife, Stephanie Khurana, were named master and co-master of Cabot House. The pair remained in these roles, though the specific title was changed from "master" to "faculty dean," until 2020.

Dean of Harvard College
In July 2014, Khurana was appointed Dean of Harvard College.  In May 2016, Harvard announced restrictions on undergraduates who belong to fraternities or gender-exclusive organizations not formally affiliated with the college, some of which are known as "final clubs." Harvard began to admit women undergraduates in 1977, and Harvard and Radcliffe officially merged in 1999. Khurana worked with University President Drew Gilpin Faust to develop the new policy. At the time, Khurana said the exclusion of women practiced by the male-only clubs had no place in the 21st century. The restrictions on students belonging to these clubs include ineligibility for leadership positions in student organizations affiliated with Harvard, such as sports teams, and ineligibility for required Harvard endorsement for fellowships such as Rhodes and Marshall fellowships. The restrictions were challenged in state and federal courts and the University ultimately abandoned enforcement of the sanctions in June 2020 following an unrelated Supreme Court ruling, Bostock v. Clayton County, on sex discrimination.

References

External links

 Harvard College profile
 http://www.hbs.edu/Pages/search.aspx?q=Rakesh%20Khurana

1967 births
Living people
American business theorists
Harvard University alumni
Cornell University School of Industrial and Labor Relations alumni
Harvard Business School faculty
MIT Sloan School of Management faculty
American academics of Indian descent
Indian emigrants to the United States